Cəfərabad or Jafarabad may refer to:
Cəfərabad, Jabrayil, Azerbaijan
Cəfərabad, Shaki, Azerbaijan
Aşağı Fərəcan, Azerbaijan